John Strachey may refer to:

John Strachey (geologist) (1671–1743), British geologist
John Strachey (civil servant) (1823–1907), British civil servant in India
John Strachey (journalist) (1860–1927), editor of The Spectator
John Strachey (politician) (1901–1963), British Labour politician
John Strachey (priest) (1737–1818), Archdeacon of Suffolk
Jack Strachey (1894–1972), English composer and songwriter

See also
 Strachey